Assisi Convent School (commonly known as ACS) is a private school located in Etah, Uttar Pradesh, India.

History 

Assisi Convent School Etah is a private, unaided Christian Minority Institution established in 1962 by the Franciscan Clarist Sisters. It is run by Assisi Convent Education Society Etah. It is a Co-educational Institution open to children of all communities from LKG to Class XII. The institution was founded in 1962 as a minority status at Etah by the Assisi Education Society, Etah, a registered charitable education society.

It follows the syllabus of the Central Board of Secondary Education (CBSE). The medium of instruction is English. At present there are 3087 students and 89 Teachers 08 Administrative staff along with 16 Support Staff.

ACS was first started in Awagarh house (a place with 10–15 rooms in Etah).

Campus 

There are two campuses of the school, both are on located on Agra Road, Etah. The old building (junior wing) is situated near officer's colony and the new building (senior wing) is 3 km from Etah

References

http://acsetah.com/

Franciscan high schools
Catholic secondary schools in India
Primary schools in Uttar Pradesh
High schools and secondary schools in Uttar Pradesh
Christian schools in Uttar Pradesh
Etah
Educational institutions established in 1962
1962 establishments in Uttar Pradesh